Hassan Ahmed Ademov, (born 24 January 1953), is a Bulgarian politician of Turkish-Bulgarian origin.  He was born in Isperih, Bulgaria.

Until 6 August 2014, he was a Minister of Labor and Social Policy in the Oresharski cabinet.

During the COVID-19 pandemic in Bulgaria, he was the first Bulgarian politician to contract the virus.

References

External links
 Bulgarian Parliament 

1953 births
Movement for Rights and Freedoms politicians
Bulgarian people of Turkish descent
Living people
People from Isperih
Labour ministers of Bulgaria
Social affairs ministers of Bulgaria